Sixteen Mile Creek (also known as Sixteenmile Creek) is a  long tributary of the Missouri River in western Montana in the United States. The canyon through which it travels is known as "Sixteen Mile Canyon". The abandoned grade of the Chicago, Milwaukee, St. Paul and Pacific Railroad ("the Milwaukee Road") parallels the creek through the canyon;  the canyon is referred to as "Montana Canyon" in Milwaukee Road promotional material.

Sixteen Mile Creek rises in the Lewis and Clark National Forest in the Crazy Mountains in southeastern Meagher County.

Sixteen Mile Creek is one of the more historically important areas in Montana. The rail bed of the original Montana Railroad runs through this creek canyon, which includes some really outstanding scenery. The Milwaukee Road abandoned this line in 1980.

See also

List of rivers of Montana
Montana Stream Access Law

Notes

Rivers of Montana
Tributaries of the Missouri River
Bodies of water of Broadwater County, Montana
Rivers of Gallatin County, Montana
Rivers of Meagher County, Montana